Nkoana is a South-African surname. Notable people with the surname include:

Maite Nkoana-Mashabane (born 1963), South African politician
Thabiso Nkoana (born 1992), South African football player

Surnames of African origin